Players and pairs who neither have high enough rankings nor receive wild cards may participate in a qualifying tournament held one week before the annual Wimbledon Tennis Championships.

Seeds

  Jenny Byrne (qualifying competition, lucky loser)
  Rennae Stubbs (withdrew)
  Yone Kamio (first round)
  Tessa Price (qualified)
  Rossana de los Ríos (first round)
  Nicole Muns-Jagerman (second round)
  Laura Golarsa (qualified)
  Misumi Miyauchi (first round)
  Claire Wegink (qualified)
  Katrina Adams (first round)
  Monique Kiene (first round)
  Kristin Godridge (first round)
  Ai Sugiyama (qualified)
  Petra Thorén First round)
  Julie Richardson (second round)
  Meredith McGrath (qualified)

Qualifiers

  Dinky van Rensburg
  Claire Wegink
  Tessa Price
  Cammy MacGregor
  Laura Golarsa
  Ai Sugiyama
  Meredith McGrath
  Kirrily Sharpe

Lucky losers

  Jenny Byrne
  Marketa Kochta
  Louise Field

Qualifying draw

First qualifier

Second qualifier

Third qualifier

Fourth qualifier

Fifth qualifier

Sixth qualifier

Seventh qualifier

Eighth qualifier

External links

1993 Wimbledon Championships on WTAtennis.com
1993 Wimbledon Championships – Women's draws and results at the International Tennis Federation

Women's Singles Qualifying
Wimbledon Championship by year – Women's singles qualifying
Wimbledon Championships